Jesuit schools in Ireland include:

Primary schools 

Scoil Iognáid, Galway
St Declan's School, Dublin
Gardiner St. School, Dublin

Secondary schools 

Belvedere College, Dublin, founded in 1832
Clongowes Wood College, County Kildare, founded in 1814
Coláiste Iognáid, Galway, founded in 1861
Crescent College Comprehensive, Limerick, founded in 1859
Gonzaga College, Dublin, founded in 1950
Mungret College, Limerick, founded in 1882; merged with Crescent College Comprehensive in 1973
St Stanislaus College, Tullabeg, Offaly, founded in 1818; merged with Clongowes Wood College in 1886

Jesuit
 
Jesuit